USCGC Active has been the name of more than one vessel of the United States Coast Guard, and may refer to:

 , later WSC-125, a patrol boat in commission from 1926 to 1947 and from 1951 to 1962
 , a medium endurance cutter in commission since 1966
 , a planned

See also
 For ships named Active that served in the United States Revenue Cutter Service, predecessor to the United States Coast Guard, see .

United States Coast Guard ship names